Amanda Davis may refer to:
 Amanda Davis (journalist) (1955–2017), American journalist
 Amanda Davis (writer) (1971–2003), American writer

See also
List of people with surname Davis